Live in Copenhagen 30th March 2004 is a limited edition live album released by Four Tet on 10 April 2004. All copies of the album were on CD-R and only available through the Domino Records website. The final track on the album is a medley of 5 different tracks.

The album was recorded at the Rust nightclub in Copenhagen, Denmark. The cover artwork is by Kathryn Bint.

It was included in the 10th anniversary reissue of his third album Rounds.

Track listing
 "She Moves She"  – 10:39
 "Everything is Alright"  – 5:20
 "Spirit Fingers"  – 7:37
 "Glue of the World"  – 8:41
 "My Angel Rocks Back and Forth"  – 9:26
 "As Serious as Your Life"  – 15:42
 Medley  – 16:22
 "Harmony One" intro
 "Hands"
 "No More Mosquitoes" (Jam)
 "Calamine" (Radio edit Jam)
 "Tangle" outro

Four Tet albums
2004 live albums
Domino Recording Company live albums